Clive Ossafa Nobrega (born 31 August 1989) is a Guyanese professional footballer who plays as a midfielder for Guyanese club Eagles United FC and the Guyana national team.

Honours 
Alpha United
 GFF National Super League: 2013–14

Slingerz
 GFF Elite League: 2015–16

References

External links 
 
 

1989 births
Living people
Association football midfielders
Guyanese footballers
Milerock FC players
Alpha United FC players
Slingerz FC players
Guyana international footballers